The Chicago Is a Drag Festival is an annual drag festival in Chicago, Illinois, United States.

References

Annual events in Illinois
Drag events
Events in Chicago

LGBT festivals in the United States